James Nathaniel Cunliffe (5 July 1912  – 21 November 1986) was an English footballer who played as an inside forward.

Career
Born in Blackrod, Cunliffe played club football for Haslingden, Adlington, Everton and Rochdale.

Prior to his football career he worked as an apprentice plater at the Horwich Locomotive Works. For Everton he scored on his debut in March 1933. During World War II he guested for Everton, Bolton Wanderers, and Rochdale.

Cunliffe also earned one cap for the English national side on 9 May 1936. His cousin was Arthur Cunliffe, also a footballer.

He was married, with one son and one grandson, both also called James. After retirement he returned to the Horwich Locomotive Works, to work in the spring smithy section. He also played professional crown green bowls, a sport he had played as an amateur during his football career.

He died at his home on 26 November 1986 following a stroke, aged 74.

References

1912 births
1986 deaths
English footballers
England international footballers
Everton F.C. players
Rochdale A.F.C. players
English Football League players
Association football inside forwards
Everton F.C. wartime guest players
Bolton Wanderers F.C. wartime guest players
Rochdale A.F.C. wartime guest players